Lyndon Menegon (born 11 February 1948) is an Australian former cricketer. He played two first-class matches for Tasmania between 1967 and 1971.

See also
 List of Tasmanian representative cricketers

References

External links
 

1948 births
Living people
Australian cricketers
Tasmania cricketers
Cricketers from Tasmania